The Railway Museum in Utrecht is the Dutch national railway museum. It was established in 1927 and since 1954 has been housed in the former Maliebaan station.

History 
The museum was established in 1927 and was initially located in one of the main buildings of the Nederlandse Spoorwegen (Dutch National Railway) in Utrecht. At that time, the collection consisted mostly of pictures, documents, and small objects. In the 1930s the first steps were taken to conserve old historically significant rail equipment. A portion of this collection was lost during World War II.

Maliebaan station 
The collection was briefly located in the Rijksmuseum in Amsterdam, but in the 1950s the museum was moved back to Utrecht. Maliebaan station, which had been closed in 1939, was found to be a suitable site. The building was remodeled, and in 1954 the museum reopened there. In this location there was far more room to exhibit the entire collection to the public, including historical rail equipment.  Until 2003, a long line of historic steam locomotives on track one of the station was one of the most distinctive aspects of the exhibit.

Expansion and renovation 
Over the years, more rail vehicles and trams were added to the museum, and in the 1960s the plaza in front of the building was filled with rolling stock, which suffered much from the weather.  An initial improvement, in 1975, was the construction of a roofed platform  behind the building.  In 1977 the museum was expanded with a pedestrian bridge, allowing access to an exhibit area on the other side of the freight rail tracks behind the main building. The space in front of the building was then converted to a parking lot.

The right wing of the main building contained the "historic" department, with the "modern" department located in the left wing. Among the distinctive parts of the collection are models of bridges from early on in the development of the Dutch railways, and models of various train types.  In addition there are paintings, prints, and railway equipment to be seen. The "modern" section was changed in the 1980s when it was updated to include the most recent developments, including the front of a "Sprinter" train.

Between 1988 and 1989 a major renovation was undertaken. The interior of the station building was completely redone according to the modern views of that time. This version was in place through 2003. In addition, the back lot was integrated into the museum and a "railway landscape" was built there. It also became possible to take rides, both in model trains and full sized ones.  Additional buildings were added, such as the signal box from Hoogezand-Sappemeer, and a crossing guard house from Elst (in the province of Gelderland). One of the oldest railway bridges, from Halfweg, was also included. Finally, rail service between the main railway station of Utrecht and the Maliebaan station (the museum) was established by Nederlandse Spoorwegen.

Later additions, in the 1990s, were two warehouses, one of which now houses a restaurant, and a new building on the back lot with a large model railway. The growing collection of rolling stock was largely restored, and partly returned to operating condition. Some of the trains had suffered due to being stored out in the open, so there has been an ongoing effort to have the entire exhibit area roofed over.

2003 remodeling 

In 2002 a decision was made to do yet another major remodeling of the museum. The station building was closed in September 2003, gutted, and then largely restored to the way it looked in the 19th century, with the addition of the "Royal waiting room" moved there from the "Staatsspoor" railway station of The Hague, which was demolished in 1973.

Sections of the station building 
 Station hall
 Freight hall
 Dining room
 Waiting room, 3rd class
 Waiting room, 1st and 2nd class
 Royal waiting room

The new building 

During the 2002 remodeling, the back lot was also largely cleared, and completely renovated. A large new museum building was constructed, which now contains four "worlds":
 The great discovery (the early years in the 19th century)
 Dream travels (the glory days of international trains around 1900)
 Steel monsters (the 1930s and 1940s)
 The workshop (large hall with trains)
The presentation was redesigned to appeal much more to the general public, especially visitors with children, and to be interesting for corporate events and the like. The technical and historical substance of the museum has become a lower priority. The collection now serves mainly as a kind of "background" for visitors.

Much attention was given to decoration. The choice was made to offer "a little of everything" to appeal to the general public. judging from the sharp increase in attendance since the reopening in June 2005, it would seem this goal has been achieved.

In April 2010, the 5th anniversary of the re-opening was marked by a special exhibition of royal trains, called “Royal Class, Royal Railways”, opened by Queen Beatrix.

Sections of the new building 

 Conference hall and foyer
 The Open Depots
 Automated Audio Tour "world 1"
 Theater "world 2"
 Track "world 3"
 Plaza "world 4"
 Simulation "world 5"
 Warehouse "Nijverdal"
 Model Trains Cellar
 Exhibition Area
 Museum Shop
 Restaurant

Outdoors exhibit area 
On the exhibit area outside, a water tower was added near the existing signal box.  There is also a model railway, a children's playground, and an area for special events, as well as a turntable.

Rolling stock collection 
The museum currently owns a large and varied collection of rolling stock. The collection is too large to be shown in full in the limited space available. For this reason, most of the trams were dropped from the collection in the 1990s, and some of the trains are in storage. The remaining collection is no longer shown by category, as was formerly the practice, but is placed more or less at random.

The collection currently on display contains, among other things, steam locomotives, electric locomotives, diesel locomotives, train cars, freight cars, and some trams.

Steam

 De Arend (1839) - Replica built in 1939
 NS 700 no. 705 (no. 13) - Built in 1864
 NS 1000 no. 89 Nestor - Built in 1880
 NS 1300 no. 326 - Built in 1881
 NS 1600 no. 107 - Built in 1889
 NS 3700 no. 3737 - Built in 1911
 NS 2100 no. 2104 - Built in 1914
 Indonesian Railways CC50 class no 22 "The Monster" - Built-in 1928, The largest locomotive in the collection.
 NS 6300 no. 6317 - Built in 1931
 WD Austerity 2-10-0 73755 Longmoor - Built in 1945

Diesel

 Oersik 103 - Built in 1930
 Oersik 137 - Built in 1932
 NS Class 200 no. 311 - Built in 1940
 NS Class 200 no. 345 - Built in 1945
 NS Class 200 no. 362 - Built in 1951
 Hippel Bakkie NS508 - Built in 1944
 Hippel Bakkie NS512 - Built in 1945
 NS Class 600 no. 605 - Built in 1955
 NS Class 600 no. 629 - Built in 1956
 NS 2200 no. 2215 - Built in 1955
 NS 2200 no. 2264 - Built in 1956
 NS 2400 no. 2498 - Built in 1956

Electric

 NS Class 1000 no. 1010 - Built in 1949
 NS Class 1100 no. 1122 - Built in 1951
 NS Class 1100 no. 1125 - Built in 1955
 NS Class 1200 no. 1202 - Built in 1951
 NS Class 1200 no. 1211 - Built in 1952
 NS Class 1300 no. 1302 - Built in 1952
 NS Class 1300 no. 1312 - Built in 1956
 NS Class 1500 no. 1501 "Diana" Built in 1954
 NS Class 1600 no. 1656 - Built in 1983
 NS Class 1700 no. 1768 - Built in 1993

DMUs

 NS 41 - Built in 1954
 NS 27 - Built in 1934
 NS 20 - Built in 1954
 Plan U no. 114 - Built in 1960
 Mat '34 - Built in 1934
 DM90 no. 3426 - Built in 1997

EMUs

 ZHESM 6 - Built in 1908
 Mat '24 - Built in 1927
 Mat '36 no. 252 - Built in 1938
 Mat '46 no. 273 - Built in 1952
 Mat '54 no. 386 - Built in 1962
 Mat '64 no. 876 - Built in 1972
 SGMm no. 2133 - Built in 1979

Passenger cars

 Arend Wagons HIJSM 4, 8 & 10 - Built in 1839
 Saloon coach 1 - Built in 1864
 Koekblik SSC218 - Built in 1874
 NCS B 119 - Built in 1904
 HSM C 755 - Built in 1907
 Wooden carriage SSC723 - Built in 1910
 Oriënt Express WR2287 - Built in 1911
 Salon Rijtuig 8&9 - Built in 1932
 Blauwe Roemeen WR4249 - Built in 1943
 Plan D - NS AB 7709 - Built in 1950
 Plan D - NS RD 7659 - Built in 1951
 Plan E - NS CKD6910 - Built in 1955
 Plan E - NS C6703 - Built in 1956
 Plan K - NS AB7376 - Built in 1958
 Slaaprijtuig CIWL4750 - Built in 1964
 Plan W - NS B4118 - Built in 1966
 DDM-1 - NS Bvk 6908 - Built in 1985
 DDM-1 - NS ABv 6618 - Built in 1985 
 ICR - NS Bs 28 101 - Built in 1986
 DD-AR - NS ABv 7576 - Built in 1993

Trams

 RSTM 2 - Built in 1881
 Horse-drawn tram STM 16 - Built in 1891

Freight cars
The museum has a diverse selection of freight vehicles.

Overview of the collection 
Some of the items in the collection are:
 Steam locomotives, for example:
 The Arend ("Eagle"), the first Dutch locomotive (replica)
 WD 73755 Longmoor (NS 5085; WD Austerity 2-10-0)
 Locomotive no. 3737, the last steam locomotive in Dutch railway service (retired 1958)
 Motor-railcar mBC 6, built in 1908, the first Dutch electrically powered train
 A large CC50 1622 Mallet locomotive which was operated by Staatspoorwegen, later Indonesian State Railway (PT Kereta Api) and repatriated back to the Netherlands in 1982.
 A Royal carriage
 A crane

Shuttle rail service between Utrecht central station and the Maliebaan station 
As part of the reopening of the renovated museum in June 2005, Utrecht Maliebaan railway station was also reopened as a normal railway station for the first time in almost 66 years. There is now train service on an hourly basis, between the museum and Utrecht Centraal railway station.

See also 
 Dual gauge
 Nederlandse Spoorwegen
 Rail transport
 Rail transport in the Netherlands

References

External links 

 Spoorwegmuseum website (in Dutch)
 Railway museums in the Netherlands

National railway museums
Railway museums in the Netherlands
National museums of the Netherlands
Museums in Utrecht (city)
Rail transport in Utrecht (city)